Wessington Springs College was an institution of higher learning located in Wessington Springs, Jerauld County, South Dakota. It was renamed "Wessington Springs Junior College" in 1918, and became Wessington Springs College in 1932. For most of its existence the school offered a four-year high school program, as well as a two-year junior college curriculum.

The institution's alumni records are now held by Central Christian College  in McPherson, Kansas. The Wessington Springs campus buildings were razed in 1970, although a "Shakespearean garden" once maintained by the school still survives nearby.

External links
 Shakespeare Garden, Wessington Springs
 Central Christian College of Kansas official web site

Defunct private universities and colleges in South Dakota
Educational institutions established in 1887
Universities and colleges in the United States affiliated with the Free Methodist Church
Demolished buildings and structures in South Dakota
Buildings and structures demolished in 1970
1887 establishments in Dakota Territory